The following tables compare general and technical information for a number of document markup languages. Please see the individual markup languages' articles for further information.

General information
 
Basic general information about the markup languages: creator, version, etc.

Note: While Rich Text Format (RTF) is human readable, it is not considered to be a markup language and is thus excluded from the table.

Characteristics
Some characteristics of the markup languages.

Notes

See also
 List of document markup languages
 Comparison of Office Open XML and OpenDocument
 Comparison of e-book formats
 Comparison of data serialization formats
Document markup languages
Comparison of document markup languages